Rachel Emma Manners, Duchess of Rutland (née Watkins, born 1963) is a British noblewoman and podcaster.

Biography
Born Emma Watkins, the daughter of a farmer from Knighton, Powys (then within Radnorshire). After schooling at Ellerslie School, Malvern, she started training as an opera singer at the Guildhall School of Music, but dropped out. She then began training as a land agent in Southampton, but quickly moved into working in estate agents marketing properties in London. She later worked as an interior designer until her marriage, after meeting her future husband at a dinner party.

Today, the Duchess runs the commercial activities of Belvoir Castle, including shooting parties, weddings and a range of furniture. She has presented on various television programmes, including ITV's Castles, Keeps and Country Homes, and has produced a book about Belvoir Castle.

Podcasting 
In 2021, the Duchess created a podcast titled Duchess, where she interviews châtelaines of castles and stately homes throughout the United Kingdom. In her podcast's first season, she interviewed Lady Ingilby of Ripley Castle, Lady Henrietta Spencer-Churchill of Blenheim Palace, Lady Derby of Knowsley Hall, Demetra Lindsay of Hedingham Castle, Lady Devon of Powderham Castle, Catherine Maxwell Stuart of Traquair House, The Hon. Martha Lytton-Cobbold of Knebworth House, Caroline, Duchess of Fife of Kinnaird Castle, Eleanor Campbell, Duchess of Argyll of Inveraray Castle, and Lady Mansfield of Scone Palace.

In her third season, she interviewed Alexandra Gage, Viscountess Gage of Firle Place.

Personal life
Watkins married David Manners, 11th Duke of Rutland, in 1992. They separated in 2012 but continue to co-habitate. The couple have five children:

Lady Violet Diana Louise Manners (b. 18 August 1993)
Lady Alice Louisa Lilly Manners (b. 27 April 1995)
Lady Eliza Charlotte Manners (b. 17 July 1997)
Charles John Montague, Marquess of Granby (b. 3 July 1999)
Lord Hugo William James Manners (b. 24 July 2003)

The family initially lived in the adjacent Knipton Lodge, a six-bedroomed Georgian house. Following the death of the 10th Duke in 2001, they moved into newly renovated private apartments, which had formerly been the nanny's residence. The couple have a staff of one butler and a nanny.

References

British people of Welsh descent
British women podcasters
Emma
Rutland
21st-century British farmers
21st-century British landowners
Women landowners
21st-century English businesswomen
21st-century English businesspeople
1963 births
Living people
People from Powys